Sylvia Lewis is an American actress, dancer and choreographer.

Career
Sylvia Lewis was born  on April 22, 1931 in York, Pennsylvania. She first performed as a young child in the last days of vaudeville in Baltimore, Maryland. She received her first classical training as a scholarship student at the Peabody Conservatory of Music, studying dance, voice and piano. She went to Hollywood at the age of twelve.

Lewis began her film career in Singin' in the Rain and Red Garters as a dancer, then in Drums of Tahiti as an actress. Later, she added choreography on her list of credits, which began while she was a regular featured character on the ABC television series Where's Raymond?, in which she played the dance partner named "Sylvia" of series star Ray Bolger. In the second season, the program was renamed The Ray Bolger Show. Lewis appeared in the 1961 film The Ladies Man where she danced with star Jerry Lewis.

Lewis was one of several actresses considered for the role of Princess Aouda in Around the World in 80 Days (1956) after Shirley MacLaine rejected it twice. Lewis tested for the role twice. MacLaine was later chosen for the role after she reconsidered it.

Lewis has choreographed many television shows since the 1950s, including Who's the Boss? and Married... with Children. Guest appearances on shows like The Dick Van Dyke Show, The Beverly Hillbillies and Gomer Pyle, U.S.M.C., plus a healthy stage career on both coasts, earned her a reputation as a triple-threat performer.

In 1995 she appeared in the Fabulous Palm Springs Follies as "July," still dancing and stunning at age 63.

Filmography

The Las Vegas Story (1952)
Harem Girl (1952)
Singin' in the Rain (1952)
She's Working Her Way Through College (1952)
Just for You (1952)
Hans Christian Andersen (1952)
Androcles and the Lion (1952)
Siren of Bagdad (1953)
Cruisin' Down the River (1953)
Those Redheads from Seattle (1953)
Gunsmoke (1953)
Drums of Tahiti (1954)
Red Garters (1954)
Bedlam in Paradise (1955)
The Lieutenant Wore Skirts (1956)
The Conqueror (1956)
Cha-Cha-Cha Boom! (1956)
The Ladies Man (1961)
 Hook, Line, and Sinker (1969)

Television work

The Colgate Comedy Hour (1951–1952) (Supporting player / dancer)
Where's Raymond? (1953–1955) (Series regular)
The George Burns and Gracie Allen Show (1956) (Guest appearance)
The Bob Cummings Show (1956–1958) (Series regular / 2 Guest appearances)
Steve Canyon (1958) (Guest appearance)
The Dennis O'Keefe Show (1959) (Guest appearance)
Zorro (1959) (Guest appearance)
Peter Gunn (1959) (Guest appearance)
Johnny Staccato (1959) (Guest appearance)
The New Steve Allen Show (1959) (Sketch performer)
The Dick Van Dyke Show (1963) (Guest appearance)
The Danny Kaye Show (1963) (Guest appearance)
Gomer Pyle, U.S.M.C. (1965) (Guest appearance)
The Beverly Hillbillies (1965) (Guest appearance)
The Andy Griffith Show (1965) (Guest appearance)
The Jerry Lewis Show (1967) (Sketch performer)

References

External links
 
 
 Official Sylvia Lewis Website

American female dancers
American dancers
American television actresses
American film actresses
American musical theatre actresses
American choreographers
People from York, Pennsylvania
Living people
21st-century American women
1931 births